Spinola Redoubt, also known as Birżebbuġa Redoubt, was a tour-reduit in Birżebbuġa, Malta. It was built by the Order of Saint John in 1715–1716 as one of a series of coastal fortifications around the Maltese Islands. It has been demolished.

History
Spinola Redoubt built in 1715–1716 part of a chain of fortifications that defended Marsaxlokk Bay, which also included three other redoubts, the large Saint Lucian Tower, two smaller De Redin towers, seven batteries and three entrenchments. The nearest fortifications to Spinola Redoubt were Pinto Battery to the northeast and Birżebbuġa Entrenchments to the south.

Spinola Redoubt was one of four tour-reduits built in Malta, with the other three being Fresnoy Redoubt, Vendôme Tower and Marsalforn Tower. It had a square shape, similar to the surviving Vendôme Tower.

The redoubt has been demolished and its site is now a public garden.

See also
Spinola Battery

References

Redoubts in Malta
Fortified towers in Malta
Hospitaller fortifications in Malta
Military installations established in 1715
Demolished buildings and structures in Malta
Birżebbuġa
Limestone buildings in Malta
18th-century fortifications
1715 establishments in Malta
18th Century military history of Malta